Murder Me, Murder You is a 1983 American made-for-television mystery film starring Stacy Keach as Mickey Spillane's iconic hardboiled private detective Mike Hammer. The film was a follow-up to another television film first aired in 1981, Margin for Murder, in which the fictitious gumshoe was portrayed by Kevin Dobson.  The Dobson film, which did not lead to a series, marked the first time the character was depicted on the small-screen since Darren McGavin played the part in the black-and-white version of Mickey Spillane's Mike Hammer, a syndicated television series (1958–1960). Murder Me, Murder You was the first of two pilots featuring Keach in the part - the other being More Than Murder (1984) - that blazed a path for the 1980s version of the CBS series Mickey Spillane's Mike Hammer, which debuted on January 28, 1984.

Plot
Mike is hired to protect Chris Jameson (Michelle Phillips), an old flame who he hasn't seen in almost 20 years. Chris heads up an all female high-risk courier agency that has become tied up in a dangerous exchange involving high-stakes bribes by an American helicopter manufacturer to a corrupt General in Central America. Chris nonetheless drops dead in the middle of testifying before a grand jury, but not before informing Mike that he has a 19-year-old daughter who is caught in the middle of everything and might already be dead.

Accolades
Screenwriter Bill Stratton was awarded the Edgar in the category of Best Mystery Teleplay Special, the first time any Spillane-inspired material was ever given the MWA's top award.

Stacy Keach's first appearance as Mike Hammer
The TV movie is significant because it marks the first appearance of Stacy Keach in the role of Hammer. After the second pilot movie, which served as the initial episode of the first CBS series, Keach would go on to star in a third made-for-TV movie (The Return of Mickey Spillane's Mike Hammer), which was followed by the return of the series to CBS, now titled The New Mike Hammer.  He went on to star in a syndicated series, Mike Hammer, Private Eye, in 1997.  In 1996 his voice was featured reading the audiobook version of Spillane's penultimate Mike Hammer novel Black Alley, and Keach continued to portray Mike Hammer in a series of radio novels entitled collectively The New Adventures of Mike Hammer.

DVD release
After almost 25 years, Murder Me, Murder You was released on DVD by Sony Pictures. The DVD comes packaged as a two-DVD set. The second disc featuring the subsequent Mickey Spillane's Mike Hammer pilot More Than Murder.

External links
 
 

1980s mystery films
1983 television films
1983 films
American detective films
American mystery films
CBS network films
Films based on American novels
Films based on works by Mickey Spillane
Films directed by Gary Nelson
Films set in New York City
Transgender-related films
1980s English-language films
1980s American films
Mike Hammer (character) films